Marcel Boishardy (7 February 1945 – 23 September 2011) was a French racing cyclist. He rode in the 1973 Tour de France.

References

1945 births
2011 deaths
French male cyclists
Place of birth missing